Titson or Budd's Titson is a hamlet in the parish of Marhamchurch, Cornwall, England, United Kingdom.

References

External links

Hamlets in Cornwall